Lasiosiphon is a genus of flowering plants belonging to the family Thymelaeaceae.

Its native range is tropical and southern Africa, Madagascar, southwestern Arabian Peninsula, India, Sri Lanka.

Species:

Lasiosiphon ambondrombensis 
Lasiosiphon angustifolius 
Lasiosiphon anthylloides 
Lasiosiphon bojerianus 
Lasiosiphon burchellii 
Lasiosiphon caffer 
Lasiosiphon calocephalus 
Lasiosiphon canoargenteus 
Lasiosiphon capitatus 
Lasiosiphon danguyanus 
Lasiosiphon daphnifolius 
Lasiosiphon decaryi 
Lasiosiphon deserticola 
Lasiosiphon dregeanus 
Lasiosiphon eminii 
Lasiosiphon esterhuyseniae 
Lasiosiphon gilbertae 
Lasiosiphon glaucus 
Lasiosiphon gnidioides 
Lasiosiphon hibbertioides 
Lasiosiphon humbertii 
Lasiosiphon insularis 
Lasiosiphon kraussianus 
Lasiosiphon lampranthus 
Lasiosiphon latifolius 
Lasiosiphon leandrianus 
Lasiosiphon macropetalus 
Lasiosiphon meisnerianus 
Lasiosiphon microcephalus 
Lasiosiphon microphyllus 
Lasiosiphon mollissimus 
Lasiosiphon nanus 
Lasiosiphon occidentalis 
Lasiosiphon ornatus 
Lasiosiphon pedunculatus 
Lasiosiphon perrieri 
Lasiosiphon polyanthus 
Lasiosiphon polycephalus 
Lasiosiphon pulchellus 
Lasiosiphon razakamalalanus 
Lasiosiphon rigidus 
Lasiosiphon rubescens 
Lasiosiphon sericocephalus 
Lasiosiphon sisparensis 
Lasiosiphon socotranus 
Lasiosiphon somalensis 
Lasiosiphon splendens 
Lasiosiphon triplinervis 
Lasiosiphon wilmsii

References

Thymelaeaceae
Malvales genera